North Carolina Highway 381 (NC 381) is a primary state highway in the U.S. state of North Carolina.  The highway connects the cities of Hamlet and Gibson.

Route description
NC 381 is a two-lane rural highway that traverses  from the South Carolina state line in Gibson to U.S. Route 74 Business near Hamlet. The highway is flanked with farms and has little traffic.

History
Established in 1940 as a renumbering of NC 78 when the route was extended to the South Carolina state line, connecting with SC 381; remained unchanged since inception.

Junction list

References

External links

NCRoads.com: N.C. 381

381
Transportation in Scotland County, North Carolina
Transportation in Richmond County, North Carolina